Chlorhoda viridis is a moth of the subfamily Arctiinae first described by Herbert Druce in 1909. It is found in eastern Peru.

References

Arctiini